New England Studios is a film studio located in Devens, Massachusetts.

The studios were built using tilt-up construction technique.

New England Studios officially opened on September 16, 2013.

It is 40 minutes outside Boston, Massachusetts and provides 24-hour gated security and parking for 271 cars and trucks.

It consists of (4) 18,000 square feet sound stages that occupy the majority of the land. NE Studios hosted its first major movie, Tumbledown in March 2015  and has hosted and provided Grip and Electric for many film and television projects since its opening. In addition to film and television projects, NE Studios hosts many commercial productions.

   

2021

 Dexter: New Blood

2018
 A Snow White Christmas
 Fear Bay
 SMILF S2 – provided Grip PKGs
 Jungle Land – provided all Electric PKGs
 Little Women – provided all Grip PKGs
 Untitled Chris Keyeser/Hamelins

2017
 Castle Rock
 Follow Back
 GhostLight - provided all Electric and Grip PKGs

 DH2
 EQ2
 I’m Not Your Daughter
 Slender Man
 Spruces and Pines
 Who Do You Think Would Win? - provided all Electric PKGs

2016
 Super Troopers 2 - provided all Electric PKGs
 Altar Rock
 Cadaver
 Grace
 Revelers
 The Vermont House

2015
 Central Intelligence
 HollyGrove
 The Last Poker Game
 The Minds Eye
 Welcome Home
 Wish X

2014
Tumbledown

2013
 Five O’Clock Comes Early
 Minister’s Wife

References

External links
 New England Studios

Companies based in Massachusetts
Cinema of Massachusetts
Television in Massachusetts
Film production companies of the United States
Television studios in the United States
American film studios